The list of Croatian players that play or have played in the National Basketball Association.

Currently active players
he following is a list of current NBA players.

Former players
The following is a list of former NBA players.

Players who are still active overseas

Drafted players
The following is a list of drafted players who have never appeared in an NBA regular season or playoff game.

Other players

Players born in Croatia 
  Nat Hickey (born on Korčula, Kingdom of Dalmatia, as Nicola Zarnecich)
  Kosta Perović (born in Osijek, SR Croatia)
  Predrag Savović (born in Pula, SR Croatia)
  Predrag Stojaković (born in Slavonska Požega, SR Croatia)

Players with Croatian citizenship 
  Justin Hamilton
  Oliver Lafayette

See also
 NBA Draft
 List of National Basketball Association players by country

References

 
NBA players
Lists of National Basketball Association players